The National Gas Museum Trust is a United Kingdom charitable trust, established in 1997 to take over the responsibility for the UK's two former gas museums.

Formations and objectives
Originally incorporated on the 16 July 1997 as a private company limited by guarantee (Company Number 3404062), its two prime objectives as set out in its Memorandum and Articles of Association are:

1. To ensure that the artefacts held by the Museum at Bromley-by-Bow, London, (now closed), and held by the John Doran Gas Museum, Leicester, are preserved for future generations
2. To establish a ‘living collection’ by providing a mechanism that would ensure gas artefacts from the present and future are collected, maintained and displayed

It has the standard Charitable Trust powers, enabling the Trust to:
Raise funds and invite and receive contributions
Acquire, alter, improve and to charge or otherwise dispose of property
Employ staff
Establish or support any charitable trusts, associations or institutions formed for all or any of the Objects
Co-operate with other charities, voluntary bodies and statutory authorities operating in furtherance of the Objects or similar charitable

Sir Denis Rooke former Chairman of British Gas was a trustee until his death on 2 September 2008.

Collection
After closure of the London museum, the entire collection was moved to the Gas Museum in Aylestone Road, Leicester. Some of collection is now on display there, and after a grant from the Heritage Lottery Fund, the entire collection has been catalogued.

References and notes
"Far from the sodding crowd" Robin Halstead et al.,Penguin

External links
National Gas Museum

Organizations established in 1997
Charities based in Leicestershire
Gas museums
Charitable trusts
1997 establishments in the United Kingdom